Tajzmel "Taz" Sherman (born July 19, 1999) is an American professional basketball player for Budapest Honvéd of the Nemzeti Bajnokság I/A, the top division in Hungary. He played college basketball for the Collin Cougars, and later for the West Virginia Mountaineers.

High school career
Sherman played basketball for Thurgood Marshall High School in Missouri City, Texas. As a senior, he helped his team reach the Class 5A state title game. Despite meeting academic requirements, he received no scholarship offers from NCAA programs, even those in the Division II and Division III. He signed with Collin College, one of two junior colleges to offer him.

College career
As a freshman at Collin College, Sherman averaged 15.2 points per game, earning First Team All-North Texas Junior College Athletic Conference (NTJCAC) and Freshman of the Year honors. In his sophomore season, he scored a career-high 47 points against Grayson College. As a sophomore, Sherman averaged 25.9 points, 4.8 assists and 4.8 rebounds per game. He was named a Second Team NJCAA Division I All-American and NTJCAC Player of the Year.

For his junior season, Sherman transferred to West Virginia over offers from SMU, Utah and Texas Tech. He averaged 5.3 points in 13.1 minutes per game as a junior. On March 2, 2021, Sherman scored a senior season-high 26 points in a 94–89 overtime loss to Baylor. He posted 21 games in double figures scoring during the season, starting six games. As a senior, he finished third on the team in scoring with 13.4 points per game, and helped West Virginia reach the second round of the NCAA Tournament. Sherman earned All-Big 12 honorable mention recognition. He declared for the 2021 NBA draft before returning to West Virginia for a fifth season of eligibility, granted due to the COVID-19 pandemic. On November 18, 2021, Sherman scored 27 points in an 87-68 victory over Elon. He was named to the Second Team All-Big 12.

Professional career
Sherman went undrafted in the 2022 NBA Draft. On October 22, 2022, he was selected with the 19th pick of the first round in the 2022 NBA G League draft by the Long Island Nets, but he was waived a week later. On October 31, he was acquired by the Birmingham Squadron, but was waived 4 days later. On November 15, was acquired by the Santa Cruz Warriors, but was again waived 5 days later without appearing in a game. On November 27 he was signed by Budapesti Honvéd SE in Hungary

Career statistics

College

NCAA Division I

|-
| style="text-align:left;"| 2019–20
| style="text-align:left;"| West Virginia
| 31 || 4 || 13.1 || .383 || .333 || .864 || .8 || .8 || .6 || .2 || 5.3
|-
| style="text-align:left;"| 2020–21
| style="text-align:left;"| West Virginia
| 28 || 6 || 24.3 || .413 || .359 || .873 || 1.8 || 1.4 || .9 || .1 || 13.4
|- class="sortbottom"
| style="text-align:center;" colspan="2"| Career
| 59 || 10 || 18.4 || .403 || .349 || .871 || 1.3 || 1.1 || .7 || .2 || 9.1

JUCO

|-
| style="text-align:left;"| 2017–18
| style="text-align:left;"| Collin
| – || – || – || .471 || .388 || .807 || – || – || – || – || 15.2
|-
| style="text-align:left;"| 2018–19
| style="text-align:left;"| Collin
| 29 || 28 || – || .490 || .393 || .875 || 4.8 || 4.8 || 1.6 || .2 || 25.9
|- class="sortbottom"
| style="text-align:center;" colspan="2"| Career
| – || – || – || – || – || – || – || – || – || – || –

References

External links
West Virginia Mountaineers bio
Collin Cougars bio

1999 births
Living people
American men's basketball players
Basketball players from Texas
People from Missouri City, Texas
Shooting guards
West Virginia Mountaineers men's basketball players
Junior college men's basketball players in the United States